Hesperoceras is an orthocerid cephalopod belonging to the subfamily Michelinoceratinae which comes from the lower Mississippian of New Mexico.

Hesperoceras has a straight, orthoconic, shell with a subrectangular cross section. The sutures are straight and transverse on the narrow sides but form broad rounded lobes on the wide sides, and the siphuncle is small and central.

References
 Sweet, Walter C. (1964). Nautiloidea-Orthocerida. Treatise on Invertebrate Paleontology, Part K. Geological Soc of America, and Univ Kansas Press.

Nautiloids